The discography of the Swedish indie rock band Mando Diao currently consists of ten studio albums, twenty-nine singles, three compilation albums and three extended plays (EPs). The band is composed of Gustaf Norén, Björn Dixgård, Carl-Johan Fogelklou and Mats Björke.

Albums

Studio albums

Live albums

Compilation albums

EPs

Singles

Guest appearances
 "God Knows" was featured in FIFA 06 by EA Sports.
 "Down in the Past" was featured in 2006 FIFA World Cup Germany by EA Sports, and NHL 06 by EA Sports.
 "The Wildfire (If It Was True)" was featured in NHL 08 by EA Sports.
 "Sheepdog" was featured in UK teen drama Skins.
 "Sweet Ride" was featured in the 2005 film The Ringer.
 "Mean Street" was featured on Need for Speed: Shift by EA Games.

Music videos

DVDs
 Down in the Past (2006)
 Above and Beyond – MTV Unplugged (2010)

Notes

References

External links

 

Discographies of Swedish artists
Rock music group discographies